Bullhead is a 2011 Belgian crime film written and directed by Michaël R. Roskam and starring Matthias Schoenaerts. The film is about the prohibited use of growth hormones on cattle by farmers with ties to organised crime "hormone mafia", and tells the story of Jacky Vanmarsenille, a young Limburgish farmer, who is approached by his veterinarian to make a deal with a West-Flemish beef trader. But the murder of a federal policeman, and an unexpected confrontation with a mysterious secret from Jacky's past, set in motion a chain of events with far-reaching consequences.

The film was nominated for an Academy Award in the category of Best Foreign Language Film in 2012, but lost to A Separation. The film was shot mainly in Truiens, a Limburgish dialect.

Plot
In Sint-Truiden, cattle farmer Jacky (Matthias Schoenaerts) who runs the family business, visits a distant relative and intimidates him into selling cows. In the Limburg province, a mafia deals in illegal hormones and controls the cattle and meat trade. The farmers sell cows to the mafia, who inject the cows with hormones and the cows are made into food. Jacky is a thirty-something angry lonely man with a muscular physique who is addicted to steroids.

A West Flanders mafia heavy returns a car to two bumbling Walloon mechanics, who had earlier stolen it for him, and tells them to make it disappear. They find a bullet hole and see a news report about a murdered police detective and realize the car was involved.

Jacky's veterinarian sets up a deal for him with the West Flanders province mafia boss Marc. At the meeting he is introduced to Marc's associate Diederik, who has something to do with Jacky's mysterious past. Diederik is actually a police informant employed by police detective Eva who is investigating the hormone mafia.

20 years ago, Jacky and Diederik were childhood best friends. Jacky's dad, also a cattle farmer, dealt with the mafia and brought the boys along to a deal. Jacky fell in love with Lucia, the daughter of one of the mobsters, whose intellectually disabled brother Bruno tried to prostitute her. Jacky's dad takes the boys home, but they ride their bikes back to see Lucia, only to be caught by Bruno. Bruno forces Jacky onto the ground and his friends gather around as Bruno smashes Jacky's testicles with two rocks, castrating him. Disgusted, Bruno's friends abandon him and Diederik leaves as well. When Diederik's father, another cattle farmer, finds out, he forbids Diederik from talking to the police, as it could ruin their connections with the mafia. Jacky is forced to begin injecting testosterone, or he will never go through puberty.

In the present, Jacky goes to a store and meets a salesgirl, who is actually Lucia. He begins following her and one night, he goes into a nightclub after her. She approaches him remembering he was a customer, when she tries to speak with him, she is interrupted by her male acquaintance who flirts with her and asks her to dance. The man leaves the nightclub and Jacky follows him and savagely attacks him. Jacky next follows Lucia to see Bruno, who is now physically disabled and mute and living in care accommodation, after she leaves, he confronts Bruno. Lucia begins to suspect that Jacky is the boy that Bruno attacked when they were children. Lucia visits Jacky at his farm and, during their meeting, she receives a call from a friend informing her of the attack after her night out and that the victim is in a coma. Lucia notices bruises on Jacky's knuckles and suspects he is responsible.

The police find the stolen car and arrest the mechanics. They suspect that Jacky is involved in the murder of the detective. Diederik drives to Jacky's farm to warn him that the police are coming to arrest him, revealing he is a police informer, and the two go on the run. Jacky attempts to see Lucia, but she refuses to let him into her apartment. He becomes increasingly agitated and she invites him in. She admits that she has called the police and knows he is responsible for attacking her friend. In Lucia's bathroom Jacky administers a dangerous dose of testosterone. The police arrive and arrest him and in a testosterone induced rage he attacks the officers. He is shot in the stomach and dies from his wounds.

Cast
 Matthias Schoenaerts as Jacky Vanmarsenille
 Jeroen Perceval as Diederik Maes 'Rikkie'
 Jeanne Dandoy as Lucia Schepers
 Barbara Sarafian as Eva Forrestier
 Tibo Vandenborre as Anthony De Greef
 Frank Lammers as Sam Raymond
 Sam Louwyck as Marc de Kuyper
 David Murgia as Bruno Schepers

Production
Roskam worked over five years on the script, which was in part based on the 1995 murder of government livestock inspector Karel van Noppen who was investigating the use of growth hormones; the rest is fictitious.

Release
The film was selected for the panorama section of the 61st Berlin International Film Festival. It premiered in the United States at Fantastic Fest in Austin. Drafthouse Films acquired the rights to distribute the film in the United States where it opened on 17 February 2012 in a limited release.

Reception

Critical response 
The film has received generally favourable reviews from critics. Rotten Tomatoes gives the film a score of 87%, based on 75 reviews, and an average rating of 7.08/10. The website's critical consensus states, "Anchored by Matthias Schoenaerts' searing performance, Bullhead is a grim and gripping thriller with the cinematic sinew to match its domineering star's physicality". 
Metacritic gives the film a weighted average rating of 68/100, based on 24 reviews, indicating "generally favorable reviews".

While criticizing the film's awkward flow due to its use of flashbacks, Roger Ebert praised the performance from lead actor Matthias Schoenaerts, noting that "The one excellent aspect of the film is Matthias Schoenaerts' performance. We often follow him walking in a controlled lurch from side to side, as if merely walking is not enough of a challenge for him. We see his eyes, burning with pain. [...] [The film] impresses because of the pain, sadness and rage contained in the title performance by Flemish actor Matthias Schoenaerts, who bulked up for the role (without steroids), and seems ready to burst from his clothes and even his skin."

Awards 

Bullhead was awarded both the New Authors Audience Award and the New Authors Critic’s Prize for Best Actor (Matthias Schoenaerts) AFI Fest.  The film won the AMD-sponsored Next Wave Award at Fantastic Fest. Matthias Schoenaerts won the FIPRESCI Award for best actor at Palm Springs International Film Festival. The jury praised the actor’s "superb portrayal of an innocent and sensitive man trapped in a truculent body." It won the Best Film Award at the Ostend Film Festival, received nine Magritte Award nominations and went on to win the awards for Best Flemish Film in Coproduction, Best Screenplay, Best Actor (for Schoernaerts) and Best Editing. The film also received the André Cavens Award.

Bullhead was selected as the Belgian entry for the Best Foreign Language Film at the 84th Academy Awards. It was officially nominated in this category on 24 January 2012, but ultimately lost to the Iranian submission A Separation.

References

External links
 
 
 
 
 
 

2011 films
2011 crime drama films
Belgian crime drama films
2010s Dutch-language films
Films about organized crime in Belgium
Films set in Belgium
Films shot in Belgium
Gangster films
Magritte Award winners
Films directed by Michaël R. Roskam
Dutch-language Belgian films